Giuseppe Ambrosino Di Bruttopilo (born 10 September 2003) is an Italian professional footballer who plays as a forward for  club Cittadella, on loan from Napoli.

Club career 
Born in the island of Procida, Ambrosino first started playing football at the eponymous local grassroots club, where he was coached by his father, before joining Napoli's youth sector in 2013, aged ten. Having traveled from his hometown to Naples and vice versa for several years, the forward eventually relocated to Castel Volturno in 2020, in order to stay closer to the club's training facilities.

Following his performances in the Campionato Primavera 1, Ambrosino signed his first professional contract with Napoli in January 2022, and then became the under-19 league's top goalscorer at the end of the 2021–22 campaign. Around the same period of time, he also received his first call-ups to the first team, under head coach Luciano Spalletti.

On 1 September 2022, Ambrosino joined Serie B club Como on a season-long loan. He made his professional debut on 8 December, coming in as a substitute for Leonardo Mancuso at the 80th minute of a 0–0 league draw against Palermo. Then, he scored his first professional goal on 18 December, as he took part in a 3-0 league win against Ternana.

On 18 January 2023, Ambrosino was re-called by Napoli and subsequently sent out on a new loan to fellow Serie B side Cittadella. Three days later, he made his debut for the club, replacing Tommy Maistrello in the 71st minute of a goalless league draw against Cagliari. On 28 January, he made his first professional start in a 1–1 league draw against Venezia.

International career 

Ambrosino has represented Italy at youth international level, having played for the under-19 and under-20 national teams.

In June 2022, he was included in the Italian squad that took part in the 2022 UEFA European Under-19 Championship in Slovakia. He featured in every match, as the Azzurrini reached the semi-finals, before losing to eventual winners England.

In December 2022, he was involved in a training camp led by the Italian senior national team's manager, Roberto Mancini, and aimed to the most promising national talents.

Style of play 
Ambrosino has been described as a complete forward, who can play either as a number 9 or a shadow striker. He has been mainly regarded for his pace, his technique and his shooting abilities, but his ambidexterity, his tactical intelligence and his vision were also noticed.

He cited Zlatan Ibrahimović as his main source of inspiration, although he received comparisons to Dries Mertens, as well.

Personal life 
His father, Domenico, was also a footballer.

Career statistics

Club

Honours 
Individual
 Campionato Primavera 1 top scorer: 2021–22

References

External links 

 
 

2003 births
Sportspeople from the Province of Naples
Footballers from Campania
Living people
Italian footballers
Association football forwards
Serie B players
S.S.C. Napoli players
Como 1907 players
A.S. Cittadella players